Kenneth Richard McDevitt (4 March 1929 – 15 February 2021) was an English footballer who played as a winger for Tranmere Rovers and Rhyl.

McDevitt died on 15 February 2021, at the age of 91.

References

1929 births
2021 deaths
Association football wingers
English Football League players
English footballers
Footballers from Liverpool
Rhyl F.C. players
Tranmere Rovers F.C. players